Taşlıçay is a town in Ağrı Province in the Eastern Anatolia region of Turkey. It is the seat of Taşlıçay District. Its population is 6,140 (2021). It is located in the valley of the Murat River on the road from the city of Ağrı to Doğubeyazıt and Turkey's border with Iran. Its altitude is 1,660 m. The mayor is İsmet Taşdemir (AKP).

Taşlıçay is surrounded by high mountains (2,000m plus), including; to the north Perili, Balıkgölü (3,159 m) and Ziyarettepe (1,800 m) of the South Aras range; and to the south the Aladağlar, including Muratbaşı (Koçbaşı) (3,510 m) and Kandil (2,750 m).

History

A burial mound (höyük) to the south of Taşlıçay and numerous other ruins in the district indicate a long and varied human presence in the region. There is an Urartu temple and an Armenian monastery on the hill above the village of Taşteker.

References

Populated places in Ağrı Province
Kurdish settlements in Turkey